Le Jeune Homme et la Mort is a ballet by Roland Petit, choreographed in 1946 to Bach's Passacaglia and Fugue in C Minor, BWV 582, with a one-act libretto by Jean Cocteau. It tells the story of a young man driven to suicide by his faithless lover. Sets were by Georges Wakhévitch and costumes variously reported as being by Karinska or Cocteau. Petit is purported to have created Le Jeune Homme et la Mort for his wife-to-be Zizi Jeanmaire, but it was danced by Jean Babilée and Nathalie Philippart at its 25 June 1946 premiere at the Théâtre des Champs-Élysées with costumes by Tom Keogh.

In 1951, Petit staged the ballet at American Ballet Theatre. In 1966, he filmed the ballet in France with Rudolf Nureyev and Zizi Jeanmaire.

Le Jeune Homme et la Mort was revived by Mikhail Baryshnikov at the American Ballet Theatre in 1975 and in the 1985 movie White Nights, in arrangements by Petit for Baryshnikov. It has been in the repertoire of the Paris Opera Ballet since 1990 and was danced at its premiere there by Kader Belarbi. It has also been danced by the Ballet National de Marseilles (1984), the Berlin Opera Ballet (1985), the Boston Ballet (1998), the Bolshoi Ballet (2009), and the Mariinsky Ballet (late 1990s, revival 2012).

Original cast 

 

Nathalie Philippart

Jean Babilée

Revivals

La Scala Ballet, Teatro degli Arcimboldi, Milan, March 2006 

 

Darcey Bussell

Roberto Bolle

Sadler's Wells, November 2006 

 

Darcey Bussell

Igor Zelensky

References

External links 
March 2006 review by Susy in Ballet.co Magazine
November 30, 2006, review by Ruth Leon for Bloomberg News
November 29, 2006, review by John Percival in The Stage
Le Jeune Homme et la Mort – 1966 film with Rudolf Nureyev and Zizi Jeanmaire
Le Jeune Homme et la Mort – performance by Baryshnikov in the movie White Nights (1985)

Ballets by Roland Petit
Ballets to the music of Johann Sebastian Bach
Ballets by Jean Cocteau
Ballets designed by Barbara Karinska
Ballets designed by Georges Wakhévitch
1946 ballet premieres